The 2007 Faroe Islands Premier League was the 65th annual competition since its establishment. In this championship, AB Argir and B71 Sandur were promoted from 1. deild. At the end of the 2006 season, ÍF Fuglafjørður and B68 Toftir were relegated.

Clubs

League table

Results
The schedule consisted of a total of 27 games. Each team played three games against every opponent in no particular order. At least one of the games was at home and one was away. The additional home game for every match-up was randomly assigned prior to the season.

Regular home games

Additional home games

Top goalscorers 
 18 goals
  Amed Davy Sylla (B36)

14 goals
  Paul Clapson (KI)
  Arnbjørn Hansen (EB/Streymur)

13 goals
  Christian Lundberg (KI)

12 goals
  Clayton Soares (B71)

11 goals
  Sorin Anghel (EB/Streymur)
  Rógvi Jacobsen (HB)

10 goals
  Cardena Castilho Anderson (B36 / NSI)

9 goals
  Fróði Benjaminsen (B36)
  Andrew av Fløtum (HB)

8 goals
  Christian Høgni Jacobsen (NSI/HB)
  Hans Pauli Samuelsen (EB/Streymur)

References

Faroe Islands Premier League seasons
1
Faroe
Faroe